Paratriathlon debuted at the 2016 Summer Paralympics held in Rio de Janeiro, Brazil.

Paratriathlon is a variant of the triathlon for athletes with a variety of physical disabilities. The sport is governed by the International Triathlon Union (ITU).
The Paralympic event is a sprint race consisting of 750 m swimming, 20 km cycling and 5 km running stages.  Athletes of both sexes compete in six categories according to the nature of their physical impairments.

2016 
The Paratriathlon debuted at the 2016 Summer Paralympics held in Rio de Janeiro, Brazil.

Medals

2020
The Paratriathlon returned to the program at the 2020 Summer Paralympics in Tokyo, Japan. Classifications have been slightly amended in the interim, allowing for the introduction of a tandem-bike based triathlon for visually impaired athletes with guides.

Medal table
Updated after the 2020 Summer Paralympics.

See also
 Paratriathlon at the 2016 Summer Paralympics
 Paratriathlon at the 2020 Summer Paralympics

References

 
Paralympics
Sports at the Summer Paralympics
Paratriathlon